Mormon Station State Historic Park is a state park in downtown Genoa, Nevada, interpreting the site of the first permanent nonnative settlement in Nevada. Mormon Station was originally settled by Mormon pioneers and served as a respite for travelers on the Carson Route of the California Trail. The park features a replica of the 1851 trading post stockade (the original was destroyed by fire in 1910). The replica trading post houses artifacts and exhibits about the station's history.

Preservation
 In June 1910, a large fire swept through Genoa, destroying a number of structures, including what remained of the Mormon Station trading post. Reconstruction of the trading post structures began in 1947 with $5,000 provided by the Nevada Legislature. Legislation in 1955 authorized the transfer of management of the property to the Division of State Parks, which took place in 1957. The site is memorialized with a tablet erected by the Sons of Utah Pioneers in 1991 and Nevada Historical Marker 12.

See also
 Old Las Vegas Mormon Fort State Historic Park

References

External links

Mormon Station State Historic Park

California Trail
State parks of Nevada
Protected areas of Douglas County, Nevada
Protected areas established in 1957
1957 establishments in Nevada
History museums in Nevada
History of Douglas County, Nevada
The Church of Jesus Christ of Latter-day Saints in Nevada
Museums in Douglas County, Nevada
Pre-statehood history of Nevada
Trading posts in the United States